Jakub Petr (born 10 April 1990) is a Czech football player who plays for Austrian club SC Wieselburg.

References

External links
 
 Guardian Football 
 
 

Czech footballers
Czech expatriate footballers
Czech Republic youth international footballers
Czech Republic under-21 international footballers
1990 births
Living people
SK Sigma Olomouc players
1. FC Slovácko players
SK Slavia Prague players
FC Vysočina Jihlava players
Czech First League players
Czech National Football League players
Association football forwards
Sportspeople from Olomouc
Czech expatriate sportspeople in Austria
Expatriate footballers in Austria